Alberto García Aspe Mena (born 11 May 1967) is a Mexican former professional footballer who played as a midfielder. He is one of the all-time appearance leaders for the Mexico national team. He participated in 109 matches, scoring a total 21 goals. In addition, he has played in three FIFA World Cups.

Club career
García Aspe's club career started in 1984 with UNAM, debuting in a 4–1 win against Puebla. García Aspe played for UNAM Pumas, Necaxa, Argentine club River Plate, América, and Puebla. He won three national championships at a professional level, with UNAM Pumas (1991) and Necaxa (1995, 1996). Overall, García Aspe played 518 games, scored 142 goals, and registered 51 assists in the Mexican First Division; his last appearance in the competition was in a 5–2 loss to Morelia.

International career
García Aspe's international debut came on February 21, 1989, in an impressive 2–1 victory against Guatemala. He participated in 109 matches, scoring a total of 21 goals. In addition, he played in three FIFA World Cup tournaments: 1994, 1998 and 2002. He scored once in 1994 against Bulgaria and once in 1998 against Belgium, both from penalty kicks. In the 2002 FIFA World Cup, García Aspe only appeared in one game, playing twelve minutes in the Round of 16 defeat to the United States.

Post career
García Aspe was an executive in UNAM. He is currently a commentator for Fox Deportes.

Honours
UNAM
Mexican Primera División: 1990–91
CONCACAF Champions' Cup: 1989

Necaxa
Mexican Primera División: 1994–95, 1995–96
Copa México: 1994–95
Campeón de Campeones: 1995
CONCACAF Cup Winners Cup: 1994

Mexico
CONCACAF Gold Cup: 1996
FIFA Confederations Cup: 1999

Career statistics

International goals
Scores and results list Mexico's goal tally first.

See also
 List of men's footballers with 100 or more international caps

References

External links
 Beto García Aspe Website
 
 International statistics at rsssf
 

1967 births
Living people
Mexican people of Spanish descent
Liga MX players
Argentine Primera División players
Club Universidad Nacional footballers
Club Necaxa footballers
Club Atlético River Plate footballers
Mexican expatriate footballers
Mexican footballers
Mexican expatriate sportspeople in Argentina
Expatriate footballers in Argentina
Club América footballers
Club Puebla players
Footballers from Mexico City
1993 Copa América players
1994 FIFA World Cup players
1995 Copa América players
1995 King Fahd Cup players
1996 CONCACAF Gold Cup players
1998 FIFA World Cup players
1999 Copa América players
1999 FIFA Confederations Cup players
2001 Copa América players
2002 FIFA World Cup players
CONCACAF Gold Cup-winning players
FIFA Confederations Cup-winning players
Mexico international footballers
Mexico under-20 international footballers
FIFA Century Club
Association football midfielders